Fort Ashby is a historic stockade fort located in Fort Ashby, West Virginia, US. A military installation constructed during the French and Indian War, it is listed on the National Register of Historic Places.

Origin
On October 26, 1755, Colonel George Washington gave orders to build a stockade and fort on the East Side of Pattersons Creek.  The fort was completed about six weeks later, commanded by Captain John Ashby and his 2nd Company of Rangers.  He had orders from Colonel Washington to remain quiet as long as he could and to hold the fort as long as possible, but if necessary rather than surrender, he should burn it and try to escape to Fort Sellers on the east side of mouth of Patterson's Creek. The only major battle at Fort Ashby occurred in 1756 when Lieutenant Robert Rutherford and his Rangers were defeated by a band of French and Indians.

Ownership
The Friends of Ashby's Fort own Fort Ashby. The museum is open Fridays, Saturdays, and Sundays, March - November, and for special events. It was listed on the National Register of Historic Places in 1970.

See also

References

External links
 

1755 establishments in the Thirteen Colonies
Ashby
buildings and structures in Mineral County, West Virginia
Ashby
Ashby
Ashby
landmarks in West Virginia
military and war museums in West Virginia
museums in Mineral County, West Virginia
National Register of Historic Places in Mineral County, West Virginia